Park Ynhui (born February 26, 1930) is a South Korean poet and writer who publishes under the name Park Yeemun in Korean.

Life
Park was born in 1930 and graduated from Seoul National University with an undergraduate degree in French literature. He then attended the Sorbonne in Paris, from which he received a PhD in Philosophy. Park spent 30 years as a professor in, Japan, Germany, France, and the United States. He taught in Boston [at Simmons College] until his retirement in 1993 at which point he returned to South Korea where he taught at Pohang University and Yonsei University.

Work

Park has published many books, mainly books and papers on philosophical topics in both French and English. He published five volumes of Korean poetry: The Snow on the Charles River (1979), Dream of a Butterfly (1981), The Shadows of the Invisible (1987) and Resonances of the Void (1989) and in 1999 has published his own poetry in English, Broken Words. Then, in 2006, he published Morning Stroll, which earned him the Incheon Prize. Park's 'non' literary works include Roadmap to a Green Korea and The Journey Isn't Over Yet.

Translator Brother Anthony (An Sonjae) summarizes Park and his work:

Park's poem's are not difficult, they are usually simple and suggestive, inviting the reader to share an experience of some moment, some scene, in which the underlying void seems to have yielded to value and meaning.
...
Park is a poet inhabited by a compassion born of the suffering he witnessed and experienced in childhood and youth. His poems re-enact a search for consolation and peace, faced with the meaninglessness and absurdity of human existence.

Works in Translation
 The Snow on the Charles River
 Shadows of the Void
 Verbrochene Worter (German)

Works in Korean (Partial)
 The Snow on the Charles River (1979)
 Dream of a Butterfly (1981)
 The Shadows of the Invisible (1987)
 Resonances of the Void (1989) 
 Morning Stroll (2006)
 Shadows of the Void (2006)
 The Fury of Elephants Raised as Orphans (2010)

Awards
 2006 Incheon Award
 2012 Tanso Cultural Award

References 

1930 births
South Korean writers
South Korean philosophers
Academic staff of Pohang University of Science and Technology
Seoul National University alumni
Living people
People from Asan